Tamer II, a  custom sailing yacht was built by Jongert in Medemblik, the Netherlands. The ship was delivered in 1986 and last refitted in 2015. Peter Sijm designed the exterior and interior. Naval architect was Doug Peterson.

Tamer II offers accommodation for up to eight guests. In addition, it can carry up to five crew. Tamer II is not available for charter.

Refit 
In 2015 Jongert completed the 18-month refit. The project started in December 2013 and was initially scheduled to take around 10 months to finish, but during the project the scope of work tripled. All of the yacht's technical spaces have been emptied, sandblasted, spot-repaired, isolated, painted and re-equipped.

See also 
 List of large sailing yachts
 List of yachts built by Jongert

References 

1986 ships
Sailing yachts
Ships built in the Netherlands
Sailboat type designs by Doug Peterson